Miss Diva is a part of Femina Miss India pageant that primarily selects India's representatives to Miss Universe,  one of the Big Four major international beauty pageants. The pageant also sends representative to Miss Supranational.

The reigning Miss Diva is Divita Rai who was crowned by the outgoing titleholder Harnaaz Sandhu.

History

After the Miss Universe Organization returned the franchise to Bennett, Coleman and Co., a separate Miss Diva pageant was held to send representatives from India to Miss Universe. In earlier days, Femina Miss India used to send its winner to compete in the Miss Universe pageant. But in 2010, Tantra Entertainment Private Limited, in collaboration with former Miss Universe and popular Bollywood actress Sushmita Sen, held a separate pageant, I Am She-Miss Universe India, to send representatives from India to Miss Universe.

After 2012, Sushmita Sen and Tantra Entertainment announced that they would relinquish the Miss Universe license and therefore Miss Diva 2013 was organized by the Femina Miss India Organization.

The first Miss Diva pageant was held on 5 September 2013 in Mumbai. Fourteen candidates were shortlisted from all across the country to compete at the main event. Manasi Moghe from Mumbai was crowned the first ever "Miss Diva Universe 2013" by Miss Asia Pacific 1970 and Bollywood actress Zeenat Aman, while Gurleen Grewal from Punjab was crowned "Miss Diva International 2013" by Miss Universe Canada 2012, Sahar Biniaz and Srishti Rana from Faridabad was crowned "Miss Diva Asia Pacific World 2013" by Bollywood actress Raveena Tandon.
 
In 2019, Liva Fluid Fashion obtained the sponsorship rights for the Miss Diva pageant and the first edition under their support was scheduled be held in 2020. Since there was no pageant in 2019, Indian representatives for international pageants were appointed by the Miss India Organization. Preceding Miss Diva delegates, Vartika Singh and Shefali Sood were selected to compete in Miss Universe 2019 and Miss Supranational 2019 respectively.

International pageants

In 2013, Srishti Rana won Miss Asia Pacific World 2013 and became the second Indian to win the title. She was crowned by the outgoing titleholder Himangini Singh Yadu from India as well.  This gave India a back-to-back victory in the pageant. Rana is the first ever Miss Diva winner to win any international title.  In 2014, India again won the pageant, making it the only country to win any international pageant three years in a row. (Many other countries such as South Africa have won consecutive pageant awards).

In 2014, Asha Bhat competed at the sixth edition of Miss Supranational and won the pageant. Asha is the first Indian and second Asian to win the said pageant. In 2016, Srinidhi Ramesh Shetty was sent to Miss Supranational in Krynica-Zdrój, Poland and she won the title of Miss Supranational 2016. India is the first country to win Miss Supranational twice and both delegates were sent by Miss Diva.

In 2021, Adline Quadros Castelino, Miss Diva Universe 2020 represented India at Miss Universe 2020, held in Hollywood, Florida, United States. There, she placed as the 3rd runner-up, thus achieving India's highest placement in Miss Universe since Lara Dutta, who won the title in the year 2000. She also achieved India's 3rd runner-up position in Miss Universe after 55 years.

In December 2021, Harnaaz Sandhu, Miss Diva Universe 2021 represented India at Miss Universe 2021, held in Eilat, Israel. She won the competition becoming India's 3rd Miss Universe.

Representatives at international pageants
Color key

Miss Universe
Miss Diva was introduced by Femina Miss India to select delegates to represent India at Miss Universe. The pageant is organized by the Bennett Coleman and Company Ltd. annually and the first edition of Miss Diva was held in 2013.

Miss Supranational
The Times Group acquired the rights to send India's representatives to Miss Supranational in 2013. From the year 2016, the first runner-up of Miss Diva is announced as Miss Supranational India.

Previous franchises 
Below are the names of delegates and the international pageants whose franchise was previously owned by the Times Group. Femina Miss India/Miss Diva no longer selects India's representatives for the below listed pageants.

Miss International 
From 1991, The Times Group had the franchise for selecting India's representatives to Miss International. In 2013, Miss Diva runner-up was sent as India's delegate.

Miss Earth 
Since the first edition of Miss Earth in 2001, to the year 2013, The Times Group selected India's representatives to the pageant. A runner-up of Miss Diva was sent to Miss Earth in the year 2014.

Miss Asia Pacific World 
The Times Group selected representatives for this pageant in 2013 and 2014. Miss Diva 2013 runner-up, Srishti Rana won the title of Miss Asia Pacific World 2013.

Titleholders

Gallery of winners

Miss Diva Universe

Miss Diva Supranational

Miss Diva editions

See also
Femina Miss India
Miss Divine Beauty
List of beauty pageants

References

External links
 Miss India Organization - website

Miss Diva
Beauty pageants in India
Femina Miss India
2013 establishments in India
India
India
Indian awards